is a Japanese manga series written and illustrated by Ching Nakamura. It was serialized in Kodansha's Monthly Morning Two from June 2007 to June 2009, before being canceled, and the manga continued its publication in Shogakukan's Monthly Ikki from February 2010 to January 2012. Shogakukan collected its chapters in three tankōbon volumes. A live-action film adaptation produced by Netflix, titled Ride or Die, premiered worldwide in April 2021.

Characters
/

/

Media

Manga
Gunjō, written and illustrated by Ching Nakamura, debuted in Kodansha's seinen manga magazine  on June 26, 2007. The manga was canceled after 13 installments on June 22, 2009. Nakamura first planned to resume the manga as dōjinshi; however, her plans changed after discussing with Shogakukan's Monthly Ikkis staff. The manga resumed publication in Monthly Ikki on February 25, 2010 and finished on January 25, 2012. Shogakukan collected its chapters in three tankōbon volumes, released from February 25, 2010 to May 30, 2012.

Volume list

Live-action film

In October 2020, it was announced that Netflix was developing a live-action film adaptation of the manga, titled , which premiered simultaneously worldwide on April 15, 2021. The film stars Kiko Mizuhara and Honami Sato. The film was directed by Ryūichi Hiroki, Nami Sakkawa wrote the scripts and Haruomi Hosono performed the theme song.

References

Further reading

External links
 
 
 

Drama anime and manga
Kodansha manga
Seinen manga
Shogakukan manga
Yuri (genre) anime and manga